Singapore participated at the 2006 Asian Games in Doha under the IOC country code SIN. It sent its largest contingent since participating in the Asian Games in 1951, with 215 members: 134 athletes and 81 officials. The contingent was led by Chef-de-Mission Annabel Pennefather and the flag-bearer was sailor Tay Junhao Roy.

A total of eight gold medals were targeted prior to the commencement of the games, three more than its best-ever haul in the 2002 Asian Games in Busan. These medals were expected in bowling, bodybuilding, sailing and cue sports. By 10 December bowling and bodybuilding delivered a gold each, although the later did not reach their target of two gold medals. Shooting and cue sports failed to deliver, while swimming contributed a surprise gold medal.
They reached their target of 8 golds at 13 December 2006, a surprising 5 golds in Sailing, beating China in the Sailing Medal Table, making it Singapore's best ever performance at the Asian games.

Medals

Medalists

Results by event

Athletics
Women's High Jump
Sng Suat Li Michelle (1.75, finished 9th out of 13)

Badminton
Men's singles
Kendrick Lee
Round of 32: lost to Japan 0-2
Ronald Susilo
Round of 32: defeated Syria (Tarek Shalboum) 2-0
Round of 16: lost to China (Bao Chunlai) 1-2

Men's doubles
Hendri Kurniawan Saputra, Hendra Wijaya
Round of 32: defeated Japan 2-0
Round of 16: lost to Indonesia 0-2

Women's singles
Li Li
Round of 32: defeated Chinese Taipei 2-1
Round of 16: lost to Hong Kong, China (Wang Chen) 0-2
Xing Aiying
Round of 32: defeated Nepal (Sumina Shrestha) 2-0
Round of 16: defeated Japan (Kaori Mori) 2-0
Quarterfinal: lost to Korea (Hwang Hye Yeon) 1-2

Women's doubles
Shinta Mulia Sari, Vanessa Neo
Round of 32: lost to Indonesia 0-2
Jiang Yanmei, Li Yujia
Round of 16: defeated Hong Kong, China (Koon Wai Chee Louisa, Wong Man Ching) 2-1
Quarterfinal: lost to Korea (Lee Kyung-won, Lee Hyo-jung) 0-2

Women's team:
Jiang Yanmei, Li Li, Li Yujia, Vanessa Neo, Shinta Mulia Sari, Xing Aiying
League Stage (Pool X): defeated Thailand 4-1
League Stage (Pool X): lost to Hong Kong, China 2-3
Semi-final: lost to Japan 3-0, finished 3rd

Mixed doubles
Li Yujia, Hendri Kurniawan Saputra
Round of 16: lost to Malaysia 0-2
Hendra Wijaya, Frances Liu
Round of 16: lost to Malaysia 0-2

Bodybuilding
Men's 60 kg
Ibrahim bin Sihat
Pre-judging Round: 18, ranked 3rd out of 14
Final Round: 46, ranked 3rd out of 5
Ng Han Cheng Vincent
Pre-judging Round: 43, ranked 9th out of 14

Men's 65 kg
Amir bin Zainal
Pre-judging Round: 36, ranked 6th out of 15
Nor Perwira Jaya Rahmat
Pre-judging Round: 41, ranked 9th out of 15

Men's 70 kg
Chua Ling Fung Simon
Pre-judging Round: 5, ranked 1st out of 15
Final Round: 15, ranked 1st out of 5

Men's 75 kg
Mohamed Ismail Muhammad
Pre-judging Round: 20, ranked 3rd out of 8
Final Round: 57, ranked 3rd out of 5

Bowling
Men's singles
De Vries Carl Jan: (176 209 224 146 205 202 Total: 1162, finished 80th out of 114)
Lee Yu-Wen: (204 184 211 236 222 204 Total: 1261, finished 29th out of 114)
Lim Guo Liang Lionel: (213 179 181 233 178 224 Total: 1208, finished 61st out of 114)
Ng Qenn Shaun: (184 199 191 202 235 186 Total: 1197, finished 65th out of 114)
Ong Remy: (223 192 193 205 257 179 Total: 1249, finished 37th out of 114)
Yeong Nathan Jason: (269 259 207 202 184 137 Total: 1258, finished 31st out of 114)

Men's doubles
Lee Yu-Wen, Ong Remy (2734, finished 6th out of 56)
Yeong Nathan Jason, Ng Qenn Shaun (2717, finished 7th out of 56)
De Vries Carl Jan, Lim Guo Liang Lionel (2693, finished 9th out of 56)

Men's Trios
Lee Yu-Wen, Yeong Nathan Jason, Ong Remy (3985, finished 2nd out of 37)
Lim Guo Liang Lionel, De Vries Carl Jan, Ng Qenn Shaun (3802, finished 8th out of 37)

Men's Five Player Teams
De Vries Carl Jan, Lee Yu-Wen, Lim Guo Liang Lionel, Ng Qenn Shaun, Ong Remy, Yeong Nathan Jason: (6346, finished 4th out of 20)

Men's All Events
De Vries Carl Jan 210.5, finished 35th out of 114
Lee Yu-Wen 217.5, finished 13th out of 114
Lim Guo Liang Lionel 204.4, finished 62nd out of 114
Ng Qenn Shaun 216.3, finished 20th out of 114
Ong Remy 218.6, finished 10th out of 114
Yeong Nathan Jason 215.0, finished 23 out of 114

Men's Masters
Lee Yu-Wen
222.8, finished 11th out of 16
Ong Remy
235.5, finished 2nd out of 16
2nd/3rd Place: defeated Korea (Choi Bok Eum) 259-195
1st/2nd Place: lost to Korea (Jo Nam Yi) 411(199,212)-455(221,234), finished 2nd

Women's singles
Chan Lu Ee Evelyn: (156 246 175 188 180 182 Total: 1127, finished 53rd out of 77)
Kwang Tien Mei Michelle: (184 219 174 182 210 249 Total: 1218, finished 26th out of 77)
Lim Li Koon Sabrina: (211 183 195 215 183 174 Total: 1161, finished 42nd out of 77)
Tan Bee Leng: (192 234 238 224 206 224 Total: 1318, finished 5th out of 77)
Tan Shi Hua Cherie: (195 186 210 222 171 225 Total: 1209, finished 29th out of 77)
Teo Hui Ying Valerie: (234 179 226 216 195 225 Total: 1275, finished 14th out of 77)

Women's Double
Kwang Tien Mei Michelle, Teo Hui Ying Valerie: (2671, finished 1st out of 37)
Tan Bee Leng, Tan Shi Hua Cherie: (2582, finished 4th out of 37)
Lim Li Koon Sabrina, Chan Lu Ee Evelyn: (2528, finished 9th out of 37)

Women's Trios
Tan Bee Leng, Kwang Tien Mei Michelle, Teo Hui Ying Valerie: (3884, finished 4th out of 24)
Tan Shi Hua Cherie, Lim Li Koon Sabrina, Chan Lu Ee Evelyn: (3533, finished 10th out of 24)

Women's Five Player Teams
Chan Lu Ee Evelyn, Kwang Tien Mei Michelle, Tan Bee Leng, Tan Shi Hua Cherie, Teo Hui Ying Valerie: (6239, finished 3rd out of 12)

Women's All Events
Chan Lu Ee Evelyn 199.4, finished 31st out of 77
Kwang Tien Mei Michelle 211.3, finished 16th out of 77
Lim Li Koon Sabrina 196.0, finished 41st out of 77
Tan Bee Leng 216.1, finished 4th out of 77
Tan Shi Hua Cherie 204.8, finished 22nd out of 77
Teo Hui Ying Valerie 218.5, finished 3rd out of 77

Women's Masters
Tan Bee Leng
206.5, finished 12th out of 16
Teo Hui Ying Valerie
211.5, finished 9th out of 16

Cue sports
Men's 8 Ball Pool-Singles
Tan Tiong Boon
Round of 32: lost to Korea (Jeoung Young Hwa) 5-9
Tay Choon Kiat Bernard
Round of 32: lost to Japan 6-9

Men's 9 Ball Pool-Singles
Chan Keng Kwang
Round of 64: lost to Indonesia (Muhammad Zulfikri Fikri) 7-11
Toh Lian Han
Round of 32: lost to Chinese Taipei (Yang Ching Shun) 9-11

Men's English Billiard-Singles
Peter Gilchrist
Round of 16: defeated Myanmar (Kyaw Oo) 3-2
Quarterfinal: defeated Thailand (Sujartthurakarn Thawat) 3-1
Semifinal: lost to India (Shandil Ya Ashok Harishankar) 0-3
Bronze Medal Match: defeated Myanmar (Aung San Oo) 3-1, finished 3rd
Puan Teik Chong Alan
Round of 16: lost to Pakistan (Shahzad Imran) 2-3

Men's English Billiard-Doubles
Peter Gilchrist, Puan Teik Chong Alan
Round of 16: defeated Qatar (AL Khaldi Mohammed, AL Obaidli Khamis) 3-0
Quarterfinal: lost to Myanmar (Aung San Oo, Kyaw Oo) 2-3

Men's Snooker-Singles
E Boon Aun Keith
Round of 32: lost to Hong Kong, China (Fu Ka Chun Marco) 1-4

Men's Snooker-Doubles
E Boon Aun Keith, Peter Gilchrist
Round of 32: lost to Malaysia (Lai Chee Wei, Moh Keen Hoo) 0-1

Men's Snooker-Teams
E Boon Aun Keith, Peter Gilchrist
Round of 32: lost to India 0-1

Women's 8 Ball Pool-Singles
Chai Zeet Huey Charlene
Round of 32: lost to China (Pan Xiaoting) 0-7
Hoe Shu Wah Amy
Round of 32: lost to Philippines (Basas Mary Ann) 6-7

Women's 9 Ball Pool-Singles
Chai Zeet Huey Charlene
Round of 16: lost to China (Pan Xiaoting) 3-7
Hoe Shu Wah Amy
Round of 16: lost to Malaysia (Kwan Esther Suet Yee) 5-7

Fencing
Women's Individual Foil
Ng Yi Lin Ruth
Round of Pooles: 21
Round of 16: lost to China (Chen Jinyan) 1-15
Tan Yu Ling
Round of Pooles: 21
Round of 16: defeated Philippines (Nuestro Veena Tessa) 15-8
Quarterfinals: lost to Korea (Nam Hyun Hee) 2-15

Women's Team Foil
Ng Yi Lin Ruth, Ser Xue Ling Serene, Tan Yu Ling, Wang Wenying
Quarterfinals: lost to Kazakhstan 34-45

Football
Men's team:
First round (Group B): tied with Syria, 0-0
First round (Group B): lost to Iraq, 0-2
First round (Group B): tied with Indonesia, 1-1
Finished at third position in Group B and failed to advance to next stage.
No results from Doha website regarding these results.

Golf
Men's Individual
Choo Tze Huang (70, 70, 69, 70, finished 4th out of 69)
Han Wen Yuan Justin (75, 74, 79, 80, finished 48th out of 69)
Khua Kian Ann Vincent (72, 75, 72, 80, finished 38th out of 69)
Leong Kit Wai Jonathan (74, 71, 70, 73, finished 16th out of 69)

Men's Team
Choo Tze Huang, Han Wen Yuan Justin, Khua Kian Ann Vincent, Leong Kit Wai Jonathan (216, 215, 211, 223, finished 6th out of 17)

Gymnastics
Women's Floor
Lim Heem Wei (Floor: 13.450, 8th out of 8)

Women's Vault
Lim Heem Wei (Vault: 13.500, 13.150, Total: 13.325, 7th out of 8)

Women's Team Individual Qualification
Lim Heem Wei (Vault: 13.150, Uneven Bars: 11.600, Beam: 12.00, Floor: 14.050, Total: 50.800, 16th out of 37)

Women's Individual All-Around
Lim Heem Wei (Vault: 13.200, Uneven Bars: 11.600, Beam: 13.050, Floor: 14.150, Total: 52.000, 9th out of 20)

Rowing
Women's Lightweight Single Sculls
Lim Kim Hiok Elsie
Heats: 6:11.92
Semifinal A/B: 3:38.22, 7th out of 8
Final B: 4:38.62, 4th out of 4

Women's Single Sculls
Lim Kim Hiok Elsie
Heats: 5:15.80
Repechage: 3:56.23
Semifinal A/B: 3:49.40, 5th out of 8
Final B: 4:33.77, 2nd out of 4

Sailing

Open Beneteau 7.5
Tan Hsiao Loong Ivan, Tay Junhao Roy, Tay Renfred, Teo Wee Chin, Wong Ming Ho Justin
Preliminary Round: 11 points, ranked 1 out of 8
Final - SIN beat IND

Shooting
Men's 10m Air Rifle
Ong Jun Hong (Qualification: 99, 98, 99, 97, 97, 97, Total: 587, 20th out of 54)
Zhang Jin (Qualification: 97, 97, 97, 97, 98, 100, Total: 586, 22nd out of 54)
Koh Tien Wei Jonathan (Qualification: 97, 96, 97, 100, 100, 96, Total: 586, 23rd out of 54)
Team score: 1759

Men's Trap
Choo Choon Seng (Qualification: 20, 20, 23, 19, 19, Total: 101, 17th out of 34)
Lee Wung Yew (Qualification: 21, 20, 24, 21, 21, Total: 107, 7th out of 34)
Mohd Zain Amat (Qualification: 19, 20, 21, 21, 20, Total: 101, 16th out of 34)
Team score: 309

Women's 10m Air Rifle
Ser Xiang Wei Jasmine (Qualification: 99, 99, 98, 100, Total: 396, 5th out of 54; Finals: 9.8, 9.5, 10.6, 9.3, 9.6, 10.8, 10.6, 10.6, 10.6, 10.3, Total: 101.7, Grand Total: 497.7, 7th position out of 8)
Ser Xiang Ying Adrienne (Qualification: 98, 98, 98, 99, Total: 393, 11th out of 54)
Yong Yu Zhen Vanessa (Qualification: 97, 99, 100, 98, Total: 394, 10th out of 54)
Team score: 1183, 2nd position

Swimming

Men's 400m Freestyle
Cheah Mingzhe Marcus (Heats: 4:03.94; 9th out of 26)
Sng Ju Wei (Heats: Withdrew)

Men's 400m Individual Medley
Lim Zhi Cong (Heats: 4:35.27, 8th out of 17; Finals: 4:35.56, 7th)

Men's 4 × 200 m Freestyle Relay
Cheah Mingzhe Marcus, Tan Lee Yu Gary, Tay Zhirong, Sng Ju Wei (Heats: 7:42.74; Finals: 7:39.61, 4th)

Women's 50m Backstroke
Lynette Ng (Heats: 30.31, 9th out of 23)
Tao Li (Heats: 29.40,4th out of 23; Finals: 29.20, 6th)

Women's 50m Breaststroke
Ho Ru En (Heats: 34.62, 9th out of 19)
Nicolette Teo (Heats: 33.33, 5th out of 19; Finals: 33.35, 7th)

Women's 50m Freestyle
Ho Shu Yong (Heats: 27.45; 15th out of 34)
Lynette Ng (Heats: 27.22, 12th out of 34)

Women's 100m Backstroke
Lynette Ng (Heats: 1:06.81, ranked 10th out of 19)

Women's 100m Breaststroke
Nicolette Teo (Heats: 1:11.65, 5th out of 17; Finals: 1:11.16, 5th)

Women's 100m Butterfly
Tao Li (Heats: 59.53, 1st out of 20; Finals: 58.96, 3rd)
Joscelin Yeo (Heats: 1:00.97, 8th out of 20; Finals: 1:00.65, 8th)

Women's 100m Freestyle
Mylene Ong (Heats: 59.29, 13th out of 28)
Lynette Ng (Heats: 59.39, 14th out of 28)

Women's 200m Breaststroke
Nicolette Teo (Heats: 2:37.41, 7th out of 14; Finals: 2:38.43, 7th)

Women's 200m Butterfly
Quah Ting Wen (2:20.52; Finals: 2:21.27, 8th)

Women's 200m Freestyle
Quah Ting Wen (Heats: 2:07:51, 9th out of 21)
Mylene Ong (Heats: 2:08:33, 10th out of 21)

Women's 400m Freestyle
Quah Ting Wen (Heats: 4:22:72; Finals: 4:21:00, 7th out of 17)
Tan Pei Shan (Heats: 4:30:07, 13th out of 17)

Women's 800m Freestyle
Quah Ting Wen (Finals: 9:01.01, 7th out of 13)
Tan Pei Shan (Finals: 9:21.10, 12th out of 13)

Women's 4 × 100 m Freestyle Relay
Ho Shu Yong, Lynette Ng, Mylene Ong, Tao Li (Heats: 3:58.47 5th out of 9; Finals: 3:53.33, 5th)

Women's 4 × 200 m Freestyle Relay
Mylene Ong, Quah Ting Wen, Tan Pei Shan, Tao Li (Heats: 8:46.16 5th out of 9; Finals: 8:31.78, 7th)

Women's 4 × 100 m Medley Relay
Mylene Ong, Tao Li, Nicolette Teo, Joscelin Yeo (Finals: 4:16.87, 5th)

Table tennis
Men's singles
Gao Ning
Round of 32: Defeated Sri Lanka (Rohana Sirisena) 4-0
Round of 16: lost to Chinese Taipei (Chuang Chih Yuan) 1-4
Yang Zi
Round of 32: Defeated Kuwait (Hatem Wadi) 4-0
Round of 16: lost to China (Ma Lin) 0-4

Men's doubles
Cai Xiaoli, Lee Tien Hoe Clarence
Round of 32: defeated Qatar 3-0
Round of 16: lost to Korea 1-3
Gao Ning, Yang Zi
Round of 32: defeated Macau, China 3-0
Round of 16: lost to Japan 1-3

Men's Team
Cai Xiaoli, Gao Ning, Ho Jia Ren Jason, Lee Tien Hoe Clarence, Yang Zi
Stage 1 (Group D): defeated North Korea 3-2
Stage 1 (Group D): lost to Chinese Taipei 1-3
Quarterfinal: lost to South Korea 0-3

Women's singles
Li Jiawei
Round of 32: Defeated Kuwait (Dalal Alhammad) 4-0
Round of 16: Defeated Thailand (Anisara Muangsuk) 4-3
Quarterfinal: Defeated South Korea (Kwak Bang Bang) 4-0
Semifinals: lost to China (Guo Yue) 1-4; finished 3rd
Sun Beibei
Round of 32: Defeated Lebanon (Lara Kejebachian) 4-0
Round of 16: lost to China (Wang Nan) 1-4

Women's doubles
Li Jiawei, Sun Beibei
Round of 32: defeated Macau, China 3-0
Round of 16: defeated Uzbekistan 3-0
Quarterfinal: lost to China (Guo Yue, Li Xiaoxia) 0-3
Tan Paey Fern, Zhang Xueling
Round of 32: lost to China 1-3

Women's Team
Li Jiawei, Sun Beibei, Tan Paey Fern, Tan Yan Zhen, Zhang Xueling
Stage 1 (Group D): defeated Macau 3-0
Stage 1 (Group D): defeated Thailand 3-1
Quarterfinal: defeated Hong Kong, China 3–1
Semifinal: defeated North Korea 3–2
Finals: lost to China 3-0; finished 2nd

Mixed doubles
Gao Ning, Zhang Xueling
Round of 32: defeated India (Roy Soumyadeep, Das Mouma) 3-1
Round of 16: lost to Hong Kong, China (Ko Lai Chak, Zhang Rui) 1-3
Yang Zi, Li Jiawei
Round of 16: defeated Japan (Seiya Kishikawa, Ai Fujinuma) 3-2
Quarterfinals: defeated Hong Kong, China (Li Ching, Tie Ya Na) 3-2
Semifinals: lost to Korea (Lee Jung Woo, Lee Eun Hee) 0-4; finished 3rd

Wushu
Men's Changquan - Three Events Combined
Siow Kin Yan
Changquan (Long-fist): 8.91, 12th out of 20
Daoshu (Broadsword): 9.32, 11th out of 20
Gunshu (Cudgel): 9.37, 8th out of 20
 Overall: 10th out of 20

Women's Changquan - Three Events Combined
Khor Poh Chin Michelle
Qiangshu (Spear): 9.25, 6th out of 12
Changquan (Long-fist): 9.38, 4th out of 12
Jianshu (Sword): 9.47, 7th out of 12
 Overall: 4th out of 12
Ng Xinni
Qiangshu (Spear): 9.05, 8th out of 12
Changquan (Long-fist): 9.26, 6th out of 12
Jianshu (Sword): 9.45, 8th out of 12
 Overall: 8th out of 12

Women's Taijiquan - Two Events Combined
Tao Yi Jun
Taijiquan (Shadow boxing): 9.49, 9th out of 16
Taijijian (Taiji sword): 9.35, 11th out of 16
 Overall: 11th out of 16

Men's Taijiquan - Two Events Combined
Yang Yong Kai Eugene
Taijiquan (Shadow boxing): 9.5, 5th out of 17
Taijijian (Taiji sword): 9.54, 5th out of 17
 Overall: 5th out of 17
Goh Qiu Bin
Taijiquan (Shadow boxing): 9.59, 3rd out of 17
Taijijian (Taiji sword): 9.54, 5th out of 17
 Overall: 3rd out of 17

Women's Nanquan - Three Events Combined
Deng Ying Zhi
Southern-fist: 0, 10th out of 11
Southern-style Cudgel: 9.27, 7th out of 11
Southern Broadsword: 9.05, 8th out of 11
 Overall: 10th out of 11

References

External links
Team Singapore at the 2006 Asian Games

Nations at the 2006 Asian Games
2006
Asian Games